This list is of the Cultural Properties of Japan designated in the category of  for the Prefecture of Ehime.

National Cultural Properties
As of 1 July 2015, forty-eight Important Cultural Properties (including three *National Treasures) with one hundred and nineteen component structures have been designated, being of national significance.

Prefectural Cultural Properties
As of 27 March 2015, thirty properties have been designated at a prefectural level.

Municipal Cultural Properties
As of 1 May 2014, two hundred and forty-one properties have been designated at a municipal level.

Registered Cultural Properties
As of 1 July 2015, one hundred and ten properties have been registered (as opposed to designated) at a national level.

See also
 Cultural Properties of Japan
 National Treasures of Japan
 List of Historic Sites of Japan (Ehime)
 List of Cultural Properties of Japan - paintings (Ehime)
 List of Cultural Properties of Japan - historical materials (Ehime)
 List of Cultural Properties of Japan - archaeological materials (Ehime)

References

External links
  Cultural Properties in Ehime Prefecture

Cultural Properties,Ehime
Buildings and structures in Ehime Prefecture
Ehime
Structures,Ehime